NYU Langone Health is an academic medical center located in New York City, New York, United States. The health system consists of NYU Grossman School of Medicine and NYU Long Island School of Medicine, both part of New York University (NYU), and more than 300 locations throughout the New York metropolitan area, including six inpatient facilities: Tisch Hospital, Kimmel Pavilion, NYU Langone Orthopedic Hospital, Hassenfeld Children's Hospital, NYU Langone Hospital – Brooklyn and NYU Langone Hospital – Long Island.  It is also home to Rusk Rehabilitation.

NYU Langone Health is ranked #3 in the nation and #1 in New York State on U.S. News & World Report’s 2022–23 “Best Hospitals Honor Roll”. NYU Grossman School of Medicine is ranked #2 in the nation on U.S. News & World Report’s 2022–23 list of “Best Graduate Schools for Research”, rising from #34 in 2010. Rusk Rehabilitation is consistently ranked one of the top 10 rehabilitation programs in the country by U.S. News & World Report. Vizient, Inc. and the Leapfrog Group, two independent healthcare performance improvement organizations, have named NYU Langone Health among the top health systems nationwide for quality and safety, and the Centers for Medicare & Medicaid Services has awarded the institution a five-star rating. NYU Langone Health’s four hospitals have all earned the Magnet designation for excellence in nursing and quality patient care from the American Nurses Credentialing Center, an honor achieved by only 9.4% of hospitals in the U.S.  NYU Langone Health is one of the largest healthcare systems in the Northeast, with more than 46,000 employees.

History

NYU Langone Health 
NYU Langone Health’s precursor, the Medical College of New York University, was founded in 1841. Among the college’s six original faculty members were renowned surgeon Valentine Mott, MD, and John Revere, MD, the youngest son of patriot Paul Revere.

In 1898, the Medical College consolidated with Bellevue Hospital Medical College, forming University and Bellevue Hospital Medical College of New York University, established at 26th Street and First Avenue in New York City, New York. This began NYU Langone Health’s long relationship with its primary teaching affiliate, NYC Health + Hospitals/Bellevue, America’s oldest public hospital, founded in 1736.

NYU Langone Health’s first hospital, established in 1948 as University Hospital on lower Broadway, was created through a merger of the New York Post-Graduate Hospital and the New York Skin and Cancer Hospital.  In 1963, a newly-acquired site in midtown Manhattan bounded by First Avenue and the Franklin D. Roosevelt East River Drive, between 30th and 34th Streets—became the home of University Hospital’s new 18-story building, which housed expanded research labs.

University Hospital was renamed Tisch Hospital in 1989 in gratitude to Laurence A. and Preston Robert Tisch and their families, benefactors of New York University. 

In 2008, NYU Medical Center, as the institution was then known, was renamed the NYU Elaine A. and Kenneth G. Langone Medical Center in honor of its chair of the Board of Trustees and his wife, whose total unrestricted gifts of $200 million represent the largest donation in the institution’s history. In 2017, NYU Langone Medical Center was renamed NYU Langone Health.

NYU Langone Health’s long-time affiliate, the Hospital for Joint Diseases, now known as NYU Langone Orthopedic Hospital, was the first hospital to merge with the institution in 2006, becoming its dedicated orthopedic hospital.

In November 2008, a $150 million donation was given for the construction of the Helen L. and Martin S. Kimmel Pavilion in honor of the late real estate developer and philanthropist Martin Kimmel.

In 2016, NYU Langone Health acquired Lutheran Medical Center, a 444-bed hospital in southwest Brooklyn, renaming it NYU Langone Hospital—Brooklyn.

In 2019, NYU Langone Health acquired Winthrop University Hospital, a 591-bed hospital in Mineola on Long Island, renaming it NYU Langone Hospital—Long Island.

NYU Langone Health also treats patients through a large network of ambulatory care facilities. By 2021, it had more than 300 locations in the New York area.

NYU Grossman School of Medicine

When NYU Grossman School of Medicine was founded in 1841, its precursor, the Medical College of New York University, had an inaugural class of 239 students.

In 2007, Robert I. Grossman, M.D., an internationally distinguished neuroradiologist who had served as chair of NYU Langone Health’s Department of Radiology since 2001, was appointed the Dean of NYU School of Medicine and CEO of NYU Medical Center, as they were then named. In 2019, the School was renamed NYU Grossman School of Medicine in honor of his academic achievements. Grossman introduced Curriculum for the 21st Century (C21), a new curriculum that allows students to have earlier and more frequent interaction with patients.In 2013, NYU Grossman School of Medicine began offering an accelerated three-year M.D. degree for select medical students to pursue a career in either primary care or the medical specialty of their choice. The first of its kind in the United States, the program is designed to ease the financial burden of medical school and launch medical careers one year earlier than traditional students.

In 2018, the school became the first top-ranked medical school in the nation to provide full-tuition scholarships to reduce the staggering debt incurred by medical students due to the ever-rising cost of their education. In 2019, NYU Langone Health expanded its medical student training when it launched NYU Long Island School of Medicine, a joint venture between New York University and NYU Langone Health. The school provides full-tuition scholarships and offers an accelerated three-year M.D. program that focuses on primary care.

NYU Grossman School of Medicine has 29 academic departments in the clinical and basic sciences. In addition to the medical degree, students can also earn a dual M.D./master’s degree.

Medical students, residents, and fellows at NYU Grossman School of Medicine receive much of their clinical training at NYC Health + Hospitals/Bellevue. The school also maintains affiliations with several other hospitals, including the VA New York Harbor Healthcare System, NYC Health + Hospitals/Gouverneur in Manhattan, and NYC Health + Hospitals/Woodhull in Brooklyn.

With a tradition of responding to urgent public health issues, the faculty and alumni of NYU Grossman School of Medicine have contributed to the control of tuberculosis, diphtheria, yellow fever, and sexually transmitted infections, the development of vaccines for hepatitis B, polio, and cancer, advances in the treatment and prevention of stroke and heart disease, the introduction of minimally invasive surgical techniques, and others. In the early 1980s, clinicians and researchers at NYU Grossman School of Medicine, including dermatologists, infectious disease specialists, immunologists, oncologists, and epidemiologists, were among the first to identify an alarming increase in Kaposi's sarcoma, opportunistic infections, and immune system failure among young gay men, and alert health authorities to an imminent health catastrophe, soon to be known as HIV/AIDS.

NYU Grossman School of Medicine counts among its faculty and alumni Nobel laureates:

 Otto Loewi, M.D. (1936), who determined that the primary language of nerve cell communication is chemical rather than electrical
 Severo Ochoa, M.D. (1959), who conducted landmark studies in biochemical genetics and nucleic acids
 Baruj Benacerraf, M.D. (1980), who performed groundbreaking research on genetic regulation of the immune system
 Eric Kandel, M.D. (2000), who discovered molecular processes that underlie learning and memory

NYU Long Island School of Medicine

In 2019, NYU Langone Health expanded its medical student training when it launched NYU Long Island School of Medicine, a joint venture between New York University and NYU Langone Health.  The NYU Long Island School of Medicine, based in Mineola, NY, houses a tuition-free MD Program with an accelerated three-year curriculum devoted exclusively to training primary care physicians. Its inaugural class graduated in 2022.

Facilities

Tisch Hospital
Tisch Hospital is an acute-care hospital with more than 350 beds located in midtown Manhattan in New York City, New York. The hospital has a critical care unit, a neonatal intensive care unit, a comprehensive stroke center, and the Ronald O. Perelman Center for Emergency Services. Tisch Hospital opened in 1963 as University Hospital. It was renamed Tisch Hospital in 1989 in gratitude to Laurence A. Tisch and Preston Robert Tisch and their families, benefactors of New York University. Tisch Hospital is a quaternary care hospital, where clinical trials are offered and highly specialized procedures are performed. More than 5,500 babies are born at Tisch Hospital each year.

Kimmel Pavilion 
The Helen L. and Martin S. Kimmel Pavilion is a 374-bed acute-care inpatient facility adjacent to Tisch Hospital in midtown Manhattan in New York City, New York. The Pavilion provides clinical services that include general and subspecialty surgery, intensive care, cardiothoracic surgery, neurosurgery, neurology, hematology, bone marrow transplant, and solid organ transplant. The Pavilion, which opened in June 2018, is New York City’s only inpatient pediatric clinical facility with exclusively private rooms. Each patient room features MyWall, a digital communication tool that allows patients to ask questions about their treatment plan, view educational videos, order meals and control the ambiance of their room.

Hassenfeld Children's Hospital

Hassenfeld Children's Hospital—34th Street, NYU Langone Health’s primary location for pediatric inpatient care, is a 68-bed pediatric acute-care  facility within the Helen L. and Martin S. Kimmel Pavilion. When the facility opened in 2018, it was the first new children’s hospital established in New York City in nearly 15 years. The hospital’s single-bedded patient rooms are designed to reduce the risk of infection and provide privacy for families. Support services and resilience programs that focus on the health and wellbeing of children and their families are provided by the Sala Institute for Child and Family Centered Care.

NYU Langone Orthopedic Hospital 
NYU Langone Orthopedic Hospital is a 225-bed specialty hospital located in the Gramercy Park neighborhood of Manhattan in New York City, New York. The hospital provides medical and surgical care for the prevention, treatment, and rehabilitation of orthopedic, musculoskeletal, rheumatic, and neurological conditions, as well as specialized care for conditions such as brain injury, joint pain, and osteoporosis. One of the nation’s first dedicated orthopedic hospitals, the hospital was a long-time affiliate of NYU Langone Health before it merged with the institution in 2006. Its name was later changed from the Hospital for Joint Diseases to NYU Langone Orthopedic Hospital. In 2014, the hospital’s Samuels Orthopedic Immediate Care Center treated more than 7,000 patients.

NYU Langone Hospital – Brooklyn
NYU Langone Hospital—Brooklyn is a 444-bed acute-care hospital located in the Sunset Park neighborhood of Brooklyn, in New York City, New York. Formerly known as NYU Lutheran Medical Center, the hospital merged with NYU Langone Health in 2016. The hospital’s Level 1 Trauma Center is certified by the American College of Surgeons. More than 4,000 babies are born at NYU Langone Hospital—Brooklyn each year.

NYU Langone Hospital – Long Island
NYU Langone Hospital—Long Island is a 591-bed acute-care hospital located in Mineola, New York. Formerly known as Winthrop University Hospital, it merged with NYU Langone Health in 2019. The hospital’s Level 1 Trauma Center is certified by the American College of Surgeons. More than 5,000 babies are born at NYU Langone Hospital—Long Island each year.

Joan and Joel Smilow Research Center 
The Joan and Joel Smilow Research Center, devoted to translational research, is located on NYU Langone Health’s midtown Manhattan campus along the Franklin D. Roosevelt East River Drive. Opened in 2006, the 13-story building houses more than 40 multidisciplinary research teams in cancer, cardiovascular biology, dermatology, genetics, and infectious diseases. It serves as the main research hub for the NYU Langone's Laura and Isaac Perlmutter Cancer Center.

Laura and Isaac Perlmutter Cancer Center 
Laura and Isaac Perlmutter Cancer Center is one of 53 cancer centers in the U.S. designated a Comprehensive Cancer Center by the National Cancer Institute, part of the National Institutes of Health. The designation signifies a commitment to research, clinical trials, education and training, community outreach, and the development of effective approaches to cancer prevention, diagnosis, and treatment.  The Center pursues research in cancer genome dynamics, cancer cell biology, melanoma, tumor immunology, and epidemiology and cancer control. The Center’s Blood and Marrow Transplant Program is certified by the Foundation for the Accreditation of Cellular Therapy to perform autologous transplants. Dermatologists at NYU Langone Health were the first to develop criteria for early detection of melanoma.

Rusk Rehabilitation 
Rusk Rehabilitation is ranked the #1 rehabilitation program in New York State by U.S. News & World Report. At NYU Langone Health’s inpatient and outpatient locations, its clinicians treat a range of adult and pediatric conditions, including brain injury, spinal cord injury, cancer, cardiac and pulmonary diseases, chronic neurological diseases, orthopedic and musculoskeletal diseases, limb loss, and stroke.

Rusk Rehabilitation was established in 1948 as the first comprehensive medical training program in rehabilitation in the world.  Its founder, Howard A. Rusk, MD, chair of the Department of Physical Medicine and Rehabilitation at what is now NYU Grossman School of Medicine, is considered the father of rehabilitation medicine. He drew on his experience treating wounded World War II veterans to develop a philosophy of caring for the patient as whole person. Rusk Rehabilitation’s inpatient programs at Tisch Hospital and NYU Langone Orthopedic Hospital are accredited by the Commission on Accreditation of Rehabilitation Facilities.

Achievements
In 2010, NYU Langone received a Gold Seal of Approval from the Joint Commission, reflecting a commitment to high-quality care, and in 2009, the Rusk Institute and Hospital for Joint Diseases received accreditation from the Commission on Accreditation of Rehabilitation Facilities.

On July 28, 2011, Becker's Hospital Review listed the Hospital for Joint Diseases at NYU Langone Health under 60 Hospitals With Great Orthopedic Programs.

NYU Langone Health has earned a 5-star rating for safety, quality, and patient experience from the Centers for Medicare & Medicaid Service.

U.S. News & World Report 
NYU Langone was ranked No. 3 on the U.S. News & World Report "Best Hospitals" 2022–2023 Honor Roll. In addition, NYU Langone rose to No. 1 in New York state and No.1 in the New York metro area.

References

External links
 
 NYU School of Medicine

New York University
Hospitals in Manhattan
Midtown Manhattan
1841 establishments in New York (state)
Hospitals established in 1841
Teaching hospitals in New York City
Tisch family